Alba Mujica (née Alba Mugica; 1916 in Carhué – 1983 in Buenos Aires) was an Argentina film and stage actress. She was the sister of actor and film director René Mugica. Her mother was the actress Emilia Rosales (Emilia Mugica). She was the mother of the actress Bárbara Mujica. Mujica attended school in La Plata. She was an actress in Argentine theater and cinema in the 1950s and 1960s. Her memoir El tiempo entre los dientes was published in 1967. Carhué's Italian Mutual Society Entertainment Hall is named "René Mugica and Mugica Alba" in recognition of the siblings.

Filmography 
 El juicio de Dios (1979)
 Tiempos duros para Drácula (1975)
 El grito de Celina (1975) Rosalía
 Juan Moreira (1973) La Muerte
 Fuego (1969) Andrea
 La muchacha del cuerpo de oro (1967) Madre de Noemí
 Cómo seducir a una mujer (1967)
 La herencia (1964) Carlota 
 El octavo infierno, cárcel de mujeres (1964) La jefa
 Las Furias (1960)
 Sabaleros (1959)
 El cerco (1959)
 Demasiado jóvenes (1958) Señora
 Graciela (1956)
 Para vestir santos (1955)
 Con el más puro amor (1955)
 Deshonra (1952) Celadora 
 Reportaje en el infierno (1951)
 Con el sudor de tu frente (1950)
 Cita en las estrellas (1949) 
 Nunca te diré adiós (1947)
 Puertos de ensueño (1942)

External links

1916 births
1983 deaths
People from Buenos Aires Province
Argentine film actresses
Argentine stage actresses
20th-century Argentine actresses